Omm ol Helianeh (also Romanized as Omm ol Helīāneh; also known as Om Helyāneh, Om Helyāneh-ye Now, Omm-e Halyāneh, and Ommoḩleyāneh) is a village in Veys Rural District, Veys District, Bavi County, Khuzestan Province, Iran. At the 2006 census, its population was 31, in 6 families.

References 

Populated places in Bavi County